The 1983–84 Alpha Ethniki was the 48th season of the highest football league of Greece. The season began on 4 September 1983 and ended on 6 May 1984. Panathinaikos won their 13th Greek title and their first one in seven years.

The point system was: Win: 2 points - Draw: 1 point.

League table

Results

Top scorers

External links
Official Greek FA Site
RSSSF
Greek SuperLeague official Site
SuperLeague Statistics

Alpha Ethniki seasons
Greece
1